Sada may refer to:

People

Given name
Sada Abe (1905–after 1971), Japanese convicted murderer, prostitute and actress
Sada Jacobson (born 1983), American Olympic fencer
Sada Thompson (1927–2011), American actress
Sada Vidoo (born 1977), Danish singer and songwriter
Sada Walkington, contestant on the first UK series of Big Brother
Sada Williams (born 1997), Barbadian sprinter
Sadha (born 1984), or Sadaa, Indian actress

Surname
Daniel Sada (born 1953), Mexican writer
Eugenio Garza Sada (1892–1973), Mexican businessman and philanthropist
Masashi Sada (born 1952), Japanese folk singer
Musa Mohammed Sada (born 1957), Nigerian politician
Sotaro Sada (born 1984), Japanese football player
Shigeri Sada (born 1954), Japanese football player
Tokuhei Sada (1909–1933), Japanese swimmer 
Víctor Sada (born 1984), Spanish basketball player

Places
Alphabetical by country
Şada, Azerbaijan
Sada, Mayotte, France
Sada, Western Ghats, Goa, India
Stadio Gino Alfonso Sada, a sports stadium in Italy
Sada, Shimane, Japan
Sadda, Khyber Pakhtunkhwa, Pakistan
Sadda, Punjab, Pakistan
Sada, Eastern Cape, South Africa
Sada, Galicia, Spain
Sada, Navarre, Spain
Waddams Grove, Illinois, previously Sada, United States
Saada Governorate, Yemen

Other uses
Sadeh, an Iranian winter festival
Savannah Accelerated Development Authority
Sayyid, an Islamic honorific

See also
Sadda (disambiguation)
Sadeh (disambiguation)

Japanese-language surnames